The Etna class is a ship class of two naval replenishment and logistic support ships used by the Italian Navy and by the Greek Navy The two ships are almost identical but they have differences in their armament and sensor equipment.

Etna
Fincantieri shipyards were awarded the contract for Etna in July 1995, and the ship was launched in July 1997. The ship was commissioned into the Italian Navy in February 1998.

Etnas main role is to fully support the long-range missions of a naval squadron, which would typically include an aircraft carrier and complete escort. Additionally it has to be in position to refuel the squadron, including the air wing of the carrier, and also provide full logistic support in terms of repair workshops, spare parts, ammunition replenishment and supplies. The ship can play a crucial role in civil protection operations when asked. The ship has high autonomous capacity to provide electrical power, fresh water and prepared meals and also has fully equipped hospital and medical facilities on board.

HS Prometheus
The construction of the Greek ship HS Prometheus began in Elefsina on February 18, 2000, at the Elefsis Shipyards. It was launched on February 19, 2002 and commissioned into the Greek Navy on July 8, 2003. It is the largest ship of the Hellenic Navy (in terms of displacement). The Greek Navy does not have an aircraft carrier like the Italian Navy so the primary role of the ship is different. As the largest ship of the fleet it is used as a Command ship.

General characteristics 

Transport Capacity:
 NATO F76 diesel fuel
 NATO F44/JP5 aviation fuel
 Lubrication oil
 fresh water

Other facilities:
30,000 rations of food supplies
up to 12 ISO1C containers,  each
 spare parts
NATO Role 2+ Hospital facilities 
NBC protection
1 workshop for helicopter operations aboard helicopter
1 machine shop for repairs on the hull and equipment on engines
1 electro-mechanical workshop
Cargo transfer system:
1 frame with 2 lateral liquid transfer stations
1 fuel transfer station astern.

Ships

Gallery

References

External links

 Etna (A 5326) Marina Militare website

Auxiliary ships of the Italian Navy
Auxiliary replenishment ship classes